Monoxenus horridus is a species of beetle in the family Cerambycidae. It was described by Hintz in 1911.

References

horridus
Beetles described in 1911